The lira was the currency of the mainland part of the Kingdom of the Two Sicilies, known as the Kingdom of Naples, between 1812 and 1813. The currency was issued by Joachim Murat, who claimed the title of "King of the Two Sicilies" but only controlled the mainland part of the kingdom. Consequently, the currency is referred to as the "Neapolitan lira". It was subdivided into 100 centesimi (singular: centesimo) and was equal to the Italian lira and French franc. It replaced the piastra, which circulated again following the restoration of Bourbon rule.

Coins

Coins were issued in denominations of 3, 5 and 10 centesimi, ½, 1, 2, 5, 20 and 40 lire. The centesimi denominations were struck in bronze, the lire coins up to 5 lire were in silver and the higher denominations were in gold. All the coins bore the head of name Joachim Murat and his adopted Italian name, "Gioacchino Napoleone".

References

Obsolete Italian currencies
1812 establishments in Italy
1813 disestablishments in Europe
1812 in Europe
1813 in Europe
19th century in the Kingdom of Naples
19th-century economic history
1812 in Italy
1813 in Italy
Economic history of Italy
Joachim Murat